Get Lucky is the second studio album by Canadian hard rock band Loverboy. It was released on October 7, 1981, by Columbia Records. The album reached number 7 on the Billboard 200 album chart, remaining on the chart for over two years, and has sold over 4 million copies in the United States. It featured the singles "Working for the Weekend", "When It's Over", "Lucky Ones", and "Take Me to the Top.”

According to Scott Smith's notes on the Greatest Hits album Big Ones, the song "Take Me to the Top" is actually the demo version "complete with out of tune bass" because the band couldn't quite capture the sound in the studio.

The album was re-released as a digitally remastered CD in July 2006 to commemorate the 25th anniversary of its original release. The remastered album features four bonus tracks, all of which were previously unreleased demos.

Artwork
The cover of the album depicts the posterior of someone wearing tight red leather pants, with a man's arm and hand in the foreground with index and middle finger crossed. The model wearing the leather pants was 13-year-old Tymara Kennedy, daughter of photographer David Michael Kennedy who shot the cover. The photo credit on the album stated "Bottom by: T.K.", which was sometimes interpreted as the publishing shorthand for the term to come. The use of red leather pants originated from Reno selecting a few items from a leather shop owned by the husband of the band manager's publicist.

Until 2014, various claims about the identity of the person wearing the leather pants were made. These included Mike Reno, the band's lead singer, who "just went along with" such claims, and Paul Dean, both of whom wore red leather pants during the concert tour for the album. At other times, both were ambiguous about the identity of the model. In a 2012 interview, Reno stated that the model was the photographer's daughter, a claim repeated in a 2013 interview. CBC Music confirmed the identity of the model in an interview with Steven Keller in August 2014. According to Kennedy, his stylist found only one pair of red leather pants while shopping in New York City before the photo shoot in 1981. They fit none of the band members or models on the set. At home later that day, his daughter returned from school, saw the pants, and asked to try them. They fit her, and Kennedy decided to use her as the model.

It is unknown whose hand and arm are in the picture. According to a 2015 article in The Toronto Star newspaper, an "Argentinian male model, six foot five" was hired "on the basis of his big hands". Tymara Kennedy died in an automobile crash in 1993, with the cover to this album as her only modelling credit.

The cover was chosen as one of the 50 greatest Canadian album covers by CBC Music staff in 2014.

The cover of American singer Joan As Police Woman's 2020 album Cover Two is an homage to this Loverboy album.

Track listing

Bonus tracks on remastered edition

Personnel
All information from the album booklet.

Loverboy
 Mike Reno – lead vocals
 Paul Dean – guitar, backing vocals
 Doug Johnson – keyboards
 Scott Smith – bass
 Matt Frenette – drums

Additional musicians
 Nancy Nash – backing vocals on "When It's Over"

Production
 Bruce Fairbairn – producer
 Keith Stein – engineer, recording
 Rob Porter – engineer, recording
 John Berg – cover design
 Bob Rock – mixing, engineer
 Mike Fraser – mixing, engineer
 George Marino – mastering
 David Kennedy – photography

Charts

Certifications

References

1981 albums
Loverboy albums
Albums produced by Bruce Fairbairn
Columbia Records albums
Juno Award for Album of the Year albums